Iván Mauricio Arboleda (born 21 April 1996) is a Colombian professional footballer who plays as a goalkeeper.

Club career
Arboleda's first club was Categoría Primera A team Deportivo Pasto, whom he was with in the youth ranks until 2014 when he departed to sign for Primera División side Banfield. He was an unused substitute three times during the 2015 campaign prior to making his professional debut in the following season on 20 March 2016 against River Plate.

On 4 September 2021, free agent Arboleda signed a contract with La Liga side Rayo Vallecano. The following 27 January, after being only a third-choice, he moved to Newell's Old Boys on loan.

International career
Arboleda represented Colombia's U17 team, winning four caps at the 2013 South American Championship in Argentina. He was selected for Colombia's preliminary squad ahead of the 2018 FIFA World Cup. However, he did not make the cut to twenty-three. He made his international bow on 26 March 2019 at the Seoul World Cup Stadium against South Korea, having been on the bench for the previous friendly versus Japan days prior.

Career statistics

Club
.

International
.

References

External links

1996 births
Living people
People from Tumaco
Colombian footballers
Colombia international footballers
Colombia youth international footballers
Association football goalkeepers
Colombian expatriate footballers
Expatriate footballers in Argentina
Colombian expatriate sportspeople in Argentina
Argentine Primera División players
Club Atlético Banfield footballers
Rayo Vallecano players
Newell's Old Boys footballers
Expatriate footballers in Spain
Colombian expatriate sportspeople in Spain
Sportspeople from Nariño Department
21st-century Colombian people